Othmar Haefliger (born 18 March 1963) is a Swiss racing cyclist. He rode in the 1990 Tour de France and the 1987 Giro d'Italia.

Major results
1986
 1st Stage 4 GP Tell
1987
 3rd GP du canton d'Argovie
 3rd Wartenberg Rundfahrt
 7th Tour du Nord-Ouest
 8th Overall Circuit Cycliste Sarthe
1st Stage 5
 8th Züri-Metzgete
1988
 7th GP du canton d'Argovie
1989
 1st Stage 5 Tour of Galicia
 1st Stage 1b Route du Sud
 6th Omloop Het Volk

References

External links
 

1963 births
Living people
Swiss male cyclists
Sportspeople from the canton of Zug